Hisingerite is an iron(III) phyllosilicate mineral with formula .  A black or dark brown, lustrous secondary mineral, it is formed by the weathering or hydrothermal alteration of other iron silicate and sulfide minerals.

It was first described in 1828 for an occurrence in Riddarhyttan, Vastmanland, Sweden. It was named after Wilhelm Hisinger (1766–1852), a Swedish chemist.

There are also aluminian hisingerite variety in which one of the iron atoms is replaced by aluminium and chrome-alumina-hisingerite variety in which chromium substitutes for iron.

References

Iron(III) minerals
Phyllosilicates